St. Augustine's High School, established in 1969, is a Roman Catholic secondary school serving the west of Edinburgh, Scotland, with approximately 700 pupils.

History
St. Augustine's RC High School was founded in August 1969. It was created on the Comprehensive School model by the merger of two existing Catholic schools: Holy Cross Academy, a selective secondary school which was established in 1907, and the non-selective St Andrew's Junior Secondary, which opened in 1962. St Augustine's moved to its present site serving the whole of the west of the city in August 1969.

The new school is named after St Augustine of Hippo.

New school

St Augustine's moved onto a shared campus with Forrester High School in January 2010. The new building is situated on the former football pitches of the school. The new building is split into two halves. On the side closest to Saughton Park is Forrester High School. On the opposite side is St Augustine's with the only shared area being the swimming pool. This is shared on a Rota basis and  the students are never taught in the same area at the same time.

Notable alumni

 Pat Stanton, footballer (Holy Cross Academy) 
 Alison Johnstone, Green Member of the Scottish Parliament for Lothian region
 Gordon Cardinal Gray, who served as Archbishop of St Andrews and Edinburgh from 1951 to 1985 (Holy Cross Academy) 
 Keith Cardinal O'Brien, who served as Archbishop of St Andrews and Edinburgh from 1985 to 2013 
 Paul Cullen, Lord Pentland, former Solicitor General for Scotland, now a Senator of the College of Justice (Holy Cross Academy)
 Stuart Wood, rhythm and bass guitarist and member of the 1970s band the Bay City Rollers.
 Sir Tom Farmer, entrepreneur (Holy Cross Academy) 
 Richard Demarco, arts impresario (Holy Cross Academy) 
 John McCluskey, Baron McCluskey, former Solicitor-General for Scotland (Holy Cross Academy) 
 Angus MacKay, former Labour Member of the Scottish Parliament 
 Sir Francis McWilliams, engineer and former Lord Mayor of London (Holy Cross Academy) 
 Jimmy O'Rourke, footballer (Holy Cross Academy)

References

External links
Official School Website

Catholic secondary schools in Edinburgh
Educational institutions established in 1969
1969 establishments in Scotland
Corstorphine